John I may refer to:

People
 John I (bishop of Jerusalem)
 John Chrysostom (349 – c. 407), Patriarch of Constantinople
 John of Antioch (died 441)
 Pope John I, Pope from 523 to 526
 John I (exarch) (died 615), Exarch of Ravenna
 John I of Naples (died c. 719)
 John of Abkhazia (ruled 878/879–880)
 John I of Gaeta (died c. 933)
 John I Tzimiskes (c. 925 – 976), Byzantine Emperor
 John I of Amalfi (died 1007)
 John I of Ponthieu (c. 1147 – 1191)
 John I (archbishop of Trier) (c. 1140-1212), Archbishop of Trier from 1190 to 1212
 John of England (1166–1216), King of England, Lord of Ireland, Duke of Normandy and Aquitaine and Count of Anjou
 John I of Sweden (c. 1201 – 1222)
 John of Brienne (c. 1148 – 1237), king of Jerusalem
 John I of Trebizond (died 1238)
 John I of Dreux (1215–1249)
 John I of Avesnes (1218–1257), Count of Hainaut
 John of Brunswick, Duke of Lüneburg (c. 1242–1277)
 John I, Count of Blois (died 1280)
 John I, Duke of Saxony (1249–1285)
 John I of Cyprus (1259–1285)
 John I, Duke of Brittany (1217–1286)
 John I Doukas of Thessaly (1268–1289)
 John I, Prince of Anhalt-Bernburg (d. 1291)
 John I of Brienne, Count of Eu (died 1294)
 John I, Duke of Brabant (1253–1294)
 John I, Count of Holland (1284–1299)
 John I of Montferrat (c. 1275–1305)
 John of Scotland (c. 1249 – c. 1313)
 John I of France (1316), king for the five days he lived
 John I Orsini (1303/4–1317), Count of Cephalonia
 John I, Duke of Bavaria (1329–1340)
 John I of Bohemia (1296–1346)
 John I of Nassau-Weilburg (1309–1371)
 John I, Duke of Opava-Ratibor (c. 1322 – c. 1380–1382)
 John I, Duke of Mecklenburg-Stargard (1326–1392/93)
 John of Islay, Lord of the Isles (died 1386)
 John I, Duke of Lorraine (1346–1390)
 John I of Castile (1358–1390)
 John I, Count of La Marche (1344–1393)
 John I of Aragon (1350–1396)
 John I of Alençon (1385–1415)
 John, Duke of Berry (1340–1416)
 John the Fearless (1371-1419), ruler of the Burgundian State from 1404-1419
 John I of Münsterberg (ca. 1380 – 1428)
 John I of Portugal (1357–1433), King of Portugal and of the Algarve, Lord of Ceuta
 John I, Duke of Bourbon (1381–1434)
 John I Albert of Poland, (1459–1501)
 João I of Kongo, ruler of the Kingdom of Kongo between 1470 and 1509
 John of Denmark called Hans of Denmark, (1455–1513), King of Denmark, Norway and Sweden 
 János Szapolyai (1487–1540), King of Hungary and Slavonia
 John, 6th Duke of Braganza (1543–1583), a.k.a. John I, Duke of Braganza
 John I, Count Palatine of Zweibrücken (1550–1604)
 Yohannes I of Ethiopia (ruled 1667–1692)
 John of Saxony (1801–1873)

Biblical
John 1, the first chapter of the Gospel of John
First Epistle of John or 1 John

See also
Jean I (disambiguation)
Juan I (disambiguation)
Johann I (disambiguation)
John (disambiguation)
King John (disambiguation)